All India Forward Bloc is a political party in India. 

All India Forward Bloc could also refer to :

All India Forward Bloc (Subhasist), Indian political party
All India Forward Bloc (Ruikar), Indian political party
All India Forward Bloc (Ramayan Singh), Indian political party